Huangnan Tibetan Autonomous Prefecture is an autonomous prefecture of Eastern Qinghai, China, bordering Gansu to the east.

Demographics 
According to the 2000 census, Huangnan has 214,642 inhabitants with a population density of 11.98 inhabitants/km2 (31.03 inhabitants/sq. mi.).

Ethnic groups in Huangnan, 2000 census

Climate

Subdivisions
The prefecture is subdivided into 4 county-level divisions: 1 county-level city, 2 counties and 1 autonomous county:

Rongwo Monastery
Huangnan is home to Rongwo Monastery,  a Gelug monastery initially established in 1341 in Amdo on the Rongwo River.

Further reading 
 A. Gruschke: The Cultural Monuments of Tibet’s Outer Provinces: Amdo - Volume 1. The Qinghai Part of Amdo, White Lotus Press, Bangkok 2001. 
 Tsering Shakya: The Dragon in the Land of Snows. A History of Modern Tibet Since 1947, London 1999,

References

 
Tibetan autonomous prefectures
Tibetan people
Amdo
Prefecture-level divisions of Qinghai